Liene Liepiņa (born 26 July 1957) is a Latvian politician who served as a Member of the European Parliament for the New Era Party from 2003 to 2004.

References

1957 births
Living people
Politicians from Bonn
New Era Party politicians
New Unity politicians
Deputies of the 8th Saeima
Deputies of the 9th Saeima
Deputies of the 10th Saeima
Deputies of the 11th Saeima
21st-century Latvian women politicians
MEPs for Latvia 2004–2009
Women deputies of the Saeima